Greetings from Isolation is a Canadian film project, launched in 2020 during the COVID-19 pandemic in Canada. Created by film programmer Stacey Donen as an "online film festival", the project features short films by Canadian film directors, created exclusively with whatever cast and equipment resources they have with them during COVID-related lockdowns.

As of January 15, 2021, 92 films premiered on the project website.

Norman Wilner of Now favourably reviewed the first batch of films on the site, writing that "there’s a fascinating range of approaches and tones, and it's endlessly interesting to see how the individual artists respond to Donen's challenge and its limitations. More often than not, they employ themselves as their own actors – because of course they'd have to – but that just makes the shorts feel even more personal and engaging. How many of these filmmakers have ever put themselves at the centre of their own work?"

The project was listed as a qualifying streaming platform for the 9th Canadian Screen Awards.

Films

See also
The Curve

References

External links

2020 in Canadian cinema
Films about the COVID-19 pandemic
Internet film festivals
2020 film festivals
Canadian video on demand services
Canadian film series